Ilya Ezhov (born January 12, 1987) is a Russian professional ice hockey goaltender. He is currently playing with Salavat Yulaev Ufa of the Kontinental Hockey League (KHL).

Playing career
Ezhov made his Kontinental Hockey League debut playing with SKA Saint Petersburg during the 2011–12 KHL season. After three seasons with Saint Petersburg, on September 6, 2014, Ezhov was traded to KHL club, HC Lada Togliatti to begin the 2014–15 season.

After two seasons as the starting goaltender for HC Neftekhimik Nizhnekamsk, Ezhov left as a free agent to sign a one-year contract with HC Vityaz on 12 July 2019.

Ezhov spent four seasons with Vityaz Podolsk before leaving as a free agent to sign a one-year contract with Salavat Yulaev Ufa on 5 May 2022.

References

External links

1987 births
HC Lada Togliatti players
Living people
HC Neftekhimik Nizhnekamsk players
Russian ice hockey goaltenders
St. John's Fog Devils players
Salavat Yulaev Ufa players
SKA Saint Petersburg players
HC Vityaz players